2021 Crete earthquake may refer to:

 2021 Arkalochori earthquake
 2021 Lasithi earthquake

See also
Crete earthquake (disambiguation)
2021 Larissa earthquake